Helena Olsson (born 4 January  1965) is a former professional tennis player from Sweden who won the 1983 French Open girls' doubles championship with Carin Anderholm and played on the WTA tour.

ITF finals

Singles (0–2)

Doubles (4–2)

References

External links
 
 

Swedish female tennis players
Living people
1965 births
Grand Slam (tennis) champions in girls' doubles
French Open junior champions